EndeavourOS is a Linux distribution based on Arch Linux. EndeavourOS features the graphical Calamares installer capable of installing the Xfce, Budgie, Cinnamon, GNOME, i3, KDE Plasma 5, LXQt, and MATE desktop environments, the former of which can be installed without an Internet connection.

EndeavourOS uses a rolling release schedule. As of 19 December 2022, the most recent release is 03-2023 ("Cassini Nova").

EndeavourOS began as a successor to Antergos, a discontinued Linux distribution also based on Arch Linux.

Background

EndeavourOS began as a continuation of the Antergos Linux distribution, a distribution itself based on Arch Linux, a general-purpose Linux distribution. In May 2019, Antergos' developers abruptly announced that development on the project would cease; a moderator of Antergos' forums discussed the idea of maintaining the community on a new forum. The idea received support from within the community, and within a day other Antergos moderators joined the project. Development on EndeavourOS quickly began, with the team planning to create a distribution that would be close to Arch Linux with the convenience of a GUI installer, while leaving GUI Pacman wrappers such as Pamac from the out-of-box installation. The first release was in July 2019.

Installation
EndeavourOS uses the Calamares system installer. While EndeavourOS was originally planned to ship with Cnchi, the net-installer used by Antergos, technical difficulties resulted in the adoption of an offline installer based on Portergos, a Linux distribution also based on Antergos, as a stop-gap until the issues could be resolved later in development. Immediately after the launch of the distribution, the EndeavourOS team began to develop a Calamares net-installer; the release of the Calamares net-installer was first expected to happen in November 2019, but the release was delayed to December. The net-installer gives users the ability to choose from a variety of desktop environments, window managers, driver (firmware) packages, and kernels during the installation process. The net-installer also allows the user to perform an offline install with the default Xfce Desktop themed with EndeavourOS branding.

Magazine
On September 11, 2019, EndeavourOS announced that they will release an online magazine, called Discovery, to give their users some background information on Arch commands and to inform them on new packages to explore. The magazine was launched in November 2019. It was later discontinued in April 2021 due to a lack of writers.

References

External links 

 
 EndeavourOS on OpenSourceFeed Gallery

Arch-based Linux distributions
Linux distributions
Pacman-based Linux distributions
Rolling Release Linux distributions